Bradley Williams (born 3 September 2004) is an English professional footballer who plays as a midfielder for  club Harrogate Town.

Career
Williams began a two-year scholarship at Harrogate Town in June 2021. He made his first-team debut for the club on 5 October 2021, coming on as a late substitute in a 2–0 win over Newcastle United U21 in an EFL Trophy match at Wetherby Road. Manager Simon Weaver said: "It's a massive moment seeing those three lads [Williams, Ilesanmi and Tweed] on the pitch. The reaction of the crowd was magical". He made his debut in EFL League Two on 3 December 2022, in a 4–1 victory at Rochdale.

Career statistics

References

2004 births
Living people
English footballers
Association football midfielders
Harrogate Town A.F.C. players
English Football League players